The Tomorrow War is a 2021 American military science fiction action film directed by Chris McKay, written by Zach Dean, and starring Chris Pratt. It was produced by David Ellison, Dana Goldberg, Don Granger, David S. Goyer, Jules Daly, and Adam Kolbrenner, with a supporting cast featuring Yvonne Strahovski, J. K. Simmons, Betty Gilpin, Sam Richardson, Edwin Hodge, Jasmine Mathews, Ryan Kiera Armstrong, and Keith Powers. It follows a mix of present-day soldiers and civilians sent into the future to fight an alien army.

Originally set for theatrical release by Paramount Pictures, the film's distribution rights were acquired by Amazon due to the COVID-19 pandemic, and digitally released on July 2, 2021, via Prime Video.

With a budget of US$200 million, the film was one of the most expensive films to debut on a streaming platform. The Tomorrow War received mixed reviews from critics, with praise for the concept, action sequences, and performances (particularly Pratt and Richardson), but criticism for its derivative execution. A sequel is in development.

Plot
In December 2022, biology teacher and former Green Beret Dan Forester fails to get a job at the Army Research Laboratory. Meanwhile, soldiers from the year 2051 interrupt the World Cup by appearing on the pitch. They announce that in November 2048, aliens called White Spikes appear in Russia and wipe out most humans within a span of three years. The world of the present-day sends their militaries into the future through the JumpLink, a rudimentary wormhole device. This prompts an international draft, but only around 30% survive their seven-day deployment. Dan eventually receives a draft notice.

The draftees are sent forward in time to a battlefield in Miami Beach, however, due to a malfunction, they are dropped hundreds of feet in the air and most fall to their deaths, while a small group lands safely in a pool. Their commander then orders them to rescue nearby lab personnel before sterilizing the area. The draftees find that all the lab personnel are dead, but recover their research. Dan survives the firebombing with two fellow draftees, a scientist named Charlie and Dorian, who is on his third deployment. 

Dan awakens in a forward operating base in Puerto Plata overseen by his daughter Colonel Muri Forester. She tells him there is a toxin that kills male White Spikes, but not the female queens, and asks for his help in capturing a female White Spike to refine the toxin to be fatal to them. She also tells Dan that in the past, he became disillusioned after failing to get his research job. It led him to divorce his wife, Emmy. He subsequently died in a car crash when Muri was sixteen.

They capture a female White Spike but are attacked by hundreds of males and narrowly escape. They then travel to DEEPSWELL-9, a fortified offshore oil platform 25 miles east of Port Nelson, where the JumpLink facility is located. Muri succeeds in developing a toxin lethal to female White Spikes. However it cannot be mass-produced in that time period, so she asks Dan to take it into the past to produce it there and prevent the war. The base is quickly overrun by male white spikes in a coordinated effort to protect their queen, killing Muri. Getting away from them, Dan returns to the past. Contact is subsequently lost with the future, indicating that the JumpLink was destroyed and the future war has been lost, leading to worldwide mass panic.

Dan and Emmy later deduce that the White Spikes arrived on Earth earlier than 2048 as there was never a record of their ship arriving. After finding volcanic ash on a White Spike's claw, Dan and Charlie consult with Dan's student, Martin, an amateur volcanologist. They determine that the White Spikes have been on Earth at least since the "Millennium Eruption" in 946 AD. 

Dan leads a mission to Russia with Charlie, Dorian, the stranded future soldiers, and his estranged father James, a Vietnam veteran. They find the alien ship frozen in ice beneath the Academy of Sciences Glacier, and surmise that global warming freed them in the future. Additionally, the frozen bodies of a reptilian-like alien species are also found on board, causing the group to deduce that the ship had crash landed on Earth, and that the White Spikes were engineered to help wipe out the native population of a planet in order to allow them to colonize. They then inject the lethal toxin into several White Spikes who have been in a state of hypersleep. This awakens the rest of the colony, who begin to attack. After awakening, the queen White Spike escapes.

Dorian, terminally ill with cancer, stays behind and blows up the ship while Dan and James pursue the queen. After a fight, Dan shoves the toxin into the queen's mouth and kills her.

Content knowing that the war is averted and humanity is saved, Dan brings his father home to meet Emmy and Muri. He is determined to avoid the same mistakes that the future Muri warned him about.

Cast

In addition, Mary Lynn Rajskub and Mike Mitchell portray draftees Norah and Cowan, respectively, while Seth Schenall portrays Martin, Dan's amateur volcanologist student.

Production

Development
The film had been in development for several years by Skydance Media when they made a deal with writer Zach Dean.

On February 13, 2019, it was announced that Chris Pratt was in negotiations to star in the film and it was confirmed that the film would be directed by Chris McKay in his live-action debut. Pratt revealed that he would also serve as an executive producer of the film, making his debut as a producer.

The film was initially named Ghost Draft, and it was revealed that the film would be about a husband and father who is drafted to fight a future war where the fate of humanity could rely on his ability to correct issues of the past. The film was described as a dark and emotional sci-fi action epic about a generation of people who get drafted to go 30 years in the future to fight a losing war against aliens. Because the initial concept for the film was considered too dark, it was decided to lighten the treatment, hoping that the requested $20 million production would be approved to make a more marketable family-friendly film.

On July 18, 2019, it was confirmed that Yvonne Strahovski would be joining the film's cast. J. K. Simmons, Betty Gilpin, Sam Richardson, Theo Von, Jasmine Mathews, Keith Powers also joined the cast in August, with Mary Lynn Rajskub, Edwin Hodge, and additional cast joining in September.

On November 10, 2019, Pratt shared a photo of the filming on his Instagram with several actors who also appear in the film, and revealed that Paramount Pictures had officially retitled the film The Tomorrow War.

Although it was not confirmed, it is likely that the film changed its name to ensure a Chinese release, due to country having banned several films about ghosts and zombies.

White Spike design
Creature designer Ken Barthelmey was confirmed to be the designer for the film's aliens. In early 2019, production designer Peter Wenham hired him due to his ability on his previous works. The crew wanted the aliens to be scary aliens called White Spikes. The aliens were described as vicious creatures that attack and eat everything in sight, and needed a compelling design that conveyed the hunger and intelligence of these creatures. The crew also wanted the aliens to have different abilities such as fast swimming and flying. This information eventually led Barthelmey to the film's final design. Additionally, Barthelmey came up with the idea of spike-shooting-tentacles, which became the major feature of the design.

Filming
Filming began on September 1, 2019, in Lincolnton, Georgia the historical city in the Central Savannah River Area. The film was also shot at the Graves Mountain Area in 2019. The battle scenes depicting a future Miami were filmed in downtown Atlanta and Buckhead, Georgia, using both CGI and live pyrotechnics to create the post-apocalyptic setting. 

Chris McKay revealed that he wanted the film to feel real rather than hyper-stylised and to shoot on location and limit the amount of green screen used, which is the reason he choose Iceland for the scenes in Russia at the glacier Vatnajökull. The crew revealed that they eventually filmed at the top of a glacier. Chris Pratt revealed that while filming, they were told that a couple froze to death after falling through a fissure, but they still decided to take the risk hoping to impress the audience. The film wrapped filming on January 12, 2020.

Special effects
For the effect of the time jump, Chris McKay wanted the time travel of the film to be unique in the film. VFX Supervisor James Price stated, "We looked at images of the northern lights and the view of Earth from space, and at one point I showed images from the Hubble Space Telescope because there's something kind of intimate and mysterious about them". 

The visual effects staff decided to create a force field that forms above the draftees right before they jump in time. With the time machine activated the travelers will slowly rise up and eventually be sent at the future. To capture the effect, the special effects team ran tests using an underwater cloud tank to simulate time-displacement. However SFX Supervisor JD Schwalm decided to use a practical wall of smoke. 

The smoke was made to be thick enough so the camera could not see through it and then a stunt coordinator rigged the actors on wires and flew them through the wall of smoke. CG electrical currents were provided in post-production so the screen can represent the actors materializing out of thin air. 

On July 1, 2021, the film was confirmed to have an estimated production budget of $200 million.

Music
On August 6, 2020, Lorne Balfe was confirmed to be the composer for The Tomorrow War. Balfe had already collaborated with director Chris McKay on the score for the 2017 animated comedy movie The Lego Batman Movie. The soundtrack album was released on July 2, 2021, by Milan Records.

Release
The film had been initially scheduled for release on December 25, 2020, by Paramount Pictures, but due to the COVID-19 pandemic it was rescheduled to July 23, 2021, taking the release date of Mission: Impossible – Dead Reckoning Part One, then later pulled from the schedule again.

In January 2021, Amazon Studios was in final talks to acquire the film for around $200 million. In April 2021, it was announced that Amazon had officially acquired the film, and released it on Amazon Prime Video worldwide on July 2, 2021.

Reception

Box office
On September 3, 2021, the film was released theatrically in China and grossed $8.1 million over the weekend, finishing in  second. By the end of its run, the film made $19.2 million.

Audience viewership
Samba TV reported that 2.41 million households watched the film from July 2–5, the most ever for an Amazon Original tracked by the service. According to Screen Engine's PostVOD summary, the "definite recommend" audience score for the film was 53%, compared to a normal score for a streaming title of 42%. 

From July 5–11 the film garnered 1.1 billion minutes of viewing according to Nielsen ratings, and was the No. 3 most watched subscription video on demand title for the week, just behind Virgin River (1.45 billion minutes) and Manifest (1.81 billion minutes). 

The film continued to top the charts in subsequent weeks, logging 1.222 billion minutes of viewership between July 21–27 (equal to about 885,507 total watches) according to Nielsen ratings. According to Samba TV, the film was watched in 5.2 million households in its first 30 days of release.

Critical response
On review aggregator Rotten Tomatoes, the film holds an approval rating of 52% based on 207 reviews, with an average rating of 5.7/10. The website's critics consensus reads, "Chris Pratt ably anchors this sci-fi adventure, even if The Tomorrow War may not linger in the memory much longer than today." On Metacritic, the film has a weighted average score of 45 out of 100, based on 35 critics, indicating "mixed or average reviews".

Richard Roeper of the Chicago Sun-Times gave the film two out of four stars and wrote, "The Tomorrow War is an earnest effort to bring something new to the time-travel action genre, but this movie is a 2021 vehicle made of parts from the 2010s and the 1990s and 1980s." 

IndieWires David Ehrlich gave the film a C grade, writing, "Which isn't to say that The Tomorrow War is bad — it boasts a clever premise, a killer supporting turn from Sam Richardson, and an uncommonly well-defined sense of place for such a murky CGI gloop-fest... But for all of those laudable attributes, this flavorless loss-leader of a film is neutered by its refusal to put audiences on their heels." 

John Defore for the Hollywood Reporter wrote that "the pic may be missing that certain something that would have made it huge in theaters" but that it is entertaining on Amazon stream anyway and praised Pratt's acting. IGN criticized then described the movie as "Supremely stupid sci-fi", and further stated that Pratt flounders in the movie. 

Leah Greenblatt from the Entertainment Weekly gave the film a B− grade and commented "Eventually the storyline dissolves into soft-focus sentiment and a final, snowy set piece whose execution is so patently ludicrous a 1970s Bond villain might file for intellectual property rights (though the climate-change message is sneakily on point). Until then it's enough, almost, just to watch Pratt & Co. race and banter and blast their way through Tomorrow's futures past." 

Robert Daniels from the Los Angeles Times wrote in his review "The Tomorrow War tries its hand at throwback ‘90s action glory, back when cinematic adventures could be everything for everybody. Instead, this post-apocalyptic combat flick lacks the intensity to reach the 1.21 gigawatts worth of power needed to emblazon our screens in escapist flair." 

Wendy Ide from The Observer wrote in her review, "The creature design is first-rate – the aliens are ravenous, rapid and equipped with a pair of death tentacles. And Pratt, and in particular Betty Gilpin as his wife, give likable, grounded performances. But the screenplay is a bloated, unwieldy thing that is at least 30 minutes longer than it should be."

Roxana Hadadi from Polygon considered the film to be repetitive and compared it unfavorably with Edge of Tomorrow and Starship Troopers, for which she stated  "We get it! This average, blue-collar American is worthy of all our admiration! That approach is so clobbering and clunky that The Tomorrow War is constantly tripping over itself while delivering it." 

Christy Lemire of RogerEbert.com gave the film one and a half out of four, and stated "The supposedly original script from writer Zach Dean offers very little that's innovative or inspired." 

Barry Hertz from The Globe and Mail compared the film unfavorably with Independence Day and Starship Troopers, criticizing its unoriginality and wrote, "It is a fool's errand to imagine what someone like Verhoeven would have done with The Tomorrow War's material – this is a movie made for the express purposes of delivering some lazy woo-hoo summer fun, not any kind of sneaky subversiveness. But if I had a time machine, I'd punt myself to the past just before The Tomorrow War went into production, and save everyone the trouble." 

Peter Travers from ABC News' Good Morning America considered the film with a cliched storytelling, gimmicky special effects and borrowed inspiration stating by commenting "The Tomorrow War chases its own tail for a crushingly repetitive 140 minutes to reach an ending you could have seen coming from deep space. To quote Yogi Berra, 'It's deja vu all over again.' There's nothing tomorrow about a recycled jumble that places all its bets on yesterday." 

Mick LaSalle from the San Francisco Chronicle praised the visuals, story and action sequences and stated, "Yet it would probably be a mistake to emphasize the relationship aspect of 'The Tomorrow War' too much. At its core, this is just a really good monster movie. All the same, there's a touch of beauty to it."

Allen Adams from The Main Edge gave the film 2.5 out of 5 and stated, "For all that, The Tomorrow War isn't a bad watch. It's got some action and some jokes and some decent performances. What it doesn't have is that underlying originality, that expression of ideas that makes the best science fiction work so well. And unfortunately, audiences will distinctly feel that lack." 

Randy Myers from The Mercury News gave three and a half out of four by commenting, "Given the scope and spectacle of the action sequences — all tautly choreographed and edited — it's a wonder that Paramount let this one get away. McKay might be best known for 'Robot Chicken' and 'The Lego Batman Movie,' but with 'Tomorrow' he emerges as the next go-to action director." 

Chris Agar from ScreenRant added in his review as a positive feedback , "The Tomorrow War boasts an interesting setup and solid performances by the cast, but it still comes across as unremarkable, if standard, genre fare." 

Hoai-Tran Bui gave a positive feedback by scoring 6.5 out of 10 to the film and stated "The Tomorrow War is not by any means great sci-fi, nor is it even significantly good sci-fi. The film is half an hour too long and starts to feel like a slog by the end of the first hour. The sentimentality threatens to veer into melodrama at points, which Pratt struggles to handle. But The Tomorrow War has got a trashy popcorn vibe to it that it wholeheartedly embraces, and a cornball machismo that you can't help but get taken in by, even if just for a second."

Accolades

Sequel
On July 8, 2021, it was reported that Skydance and Amazon were in discussions to produce a sequel, due to the film's success. The intention was to bring back director Chris McKay, screenwriter Zach Dean, and stars Chris Pratt, Yvonne Strahovski, Betty Gilpin, Sam Richardson, Edwin Hodge, and J.K. Simmons. 

It was confirmed that Paramount Pictures would be returning to be the producer of the sequel. McKay also revealed that he would like to explore more deeply the alien race that was introduced in the film, the White Spikes, even including their origins.

References

External links
 

2021 science fiction films
2021 science fiction action films
2020s dystopian films
2020s science fiction thriller films
2020s science fiction war films
2020s monster movies
Amazon Studios films
American dystopian films
American monster movies
American post-apocalyptic films
American science fiction action films
American science fiction thriller films
American science fiction war films
Films about time travel
Films produced by David S. Goyer
Films scored by Lorne Balfe
Films set in 2022
Films set in 2023
Films set in 2051
Films set in the Dominican Republic
Films set in Miami
Films set in Florida
Films set in Siberia
Films shot in Atlanta
Films shot in Iceland
Films about families
Alien invasions in films
Paramount Pictures films
Skydance Media films
Amazon Prime Video original films
Climate change films
2020s English-language films
Films directed by Chris McKay
2020s American films